is a Japanese manga artist from Sano, Tochigi Prefecture. He received recognition for his manga  at the 40th Rookie Comic Awards. After training under Kazuhiro Fujita, he published Heat Wave in Shōnen Sunday Super in 2001.  He is most known for Midori Days, which was adapted into a 13-episode anime series by Pierrot.

Works
 Heat Wave (2001, serialized in Shōnen Sunday Super, Shogakukan)
 Midori Days (2002–2004, serialized in Weekly Shōnen Sunday, Shogakukan)
 Ai Kora (2005–2008, serialized in Weekly Shōnen Sunday, Shogakukan)
 Haru Ranman! (2007, one-shot published in Young Animal, Hakusensha)
 Aoi Destruction (2007, collection of short stories, Shogakukan)
 Undead (2008, serialized in Big Comic Spirits, Shogakukan)
 Ane Comi (2009-2012, serialized in Young Animal Island, Hakusensha)
 Mahō no Iroha! (2009-2012, serialized in Shōnen Sunday Super, Shogakukan)
 Full-Scratch Eiji
 Koshoten Yakou Funsenki
 Otone no Naisho
 Maria-san wa Toumei Shoujo (Maria-san the Invisible Girl, 2014)
 Outrage Girl Shiomi (2016–2018, serialized in Shōnen Sunday Super, Shogakukan)

References

External links

Manga artists from Tochigi Prefecture
Living people
Year of birth missing (living people)